is a historical Japanese record written by Iki no Hakatoko. Composed late in the 7th century, the record is primarily known for being used as a reference in the composition of Nihon Shoki as well as for being the oldest Japanese travel record. It is no longer extant.

Contents
While the record no longer exists, a fragment of its contents may be found in quotations. Passages are quoted four times in Nihon Shoki:
the 2nd month of 654
the 7th month of 659: composed on the way to as well as at Chang'an
the 7th month of 660: composed around Luoyang
the 5th month of 661: primarily relates the return journey

The various quotations relate details about the Imperial Japanese embassies to China and foreign policy around the middle of the 7th century.

See also
 Historiography of Japan

Notes

References
 
 

Old Japanese texts
Asuka period
7th-century history books
7th-century Japanese books

ja:伊吉博徳#『伊吉博徳書』